Laurance is a surname or given name. Notable people with the name include:

Surname
 John Laurance (1750–1810), American lawyer and politician from New York
 William F. Laurance (born 1957), American-Australian biology professor
Bill Laurance (born 1981), English composer, producer, and multi-instrumental musician

Given name
 Laurance Doyle (born 1953), American scientist with the SETI Institute
 Laurance Rockefeller (1910–2004), American philanthropist, businessman, financier, and conservationist
 Laurance Rudic (born 1952), British theatre artist
 Laurance Safford (1893–1973), U.S. Navy cryptologist
 Laurance Browning VanMeter (1958 - ), Kentucky Supreme Court Justice 2017 - present

See also 
 Laurence (disambiguation)
 Lawrence (disambiguation)
 Laura (disambiguation)